This is a list of musical instruments, including percussion, wind, stringed, and electronic instruments.

Percussion instruments (idiophones and membranophones)

Wind instruments (aerophones)

Stringed instruments (chordophones)

Electronic instruments (electrophones)

AlphaSphere
Audiocubes
Bass pedals
Continuum Fingerboard
Croix Sonore
Denis d'or
Dubreq stylophone
Drum machine
Electric guitar
Electronic keyboard
Digital piano
Electronic organ
EWI
Fingerboard synthesizer
Hammond organ
Keyboard 
Keytar
Kraakdoos (or cracklebox)
Laser harp
Mellotron
MIDI controller
Eigenharp
MIDI keyboard
Seaboard
Omnichord
Ondes Martenot
Otamatone
Personal computer (when used in conjunction with a software synthesizer and DAW)
Fairlight CMI (Computer Musical Instrument)
Sampler
Skoog
Synclavier
Synthesizer
Teleharmonium
Tembûr
Tenori-on
Theremin
trautonium
Turntablism
Turntable

See also
List of medieval musical instruments
List of fictional musical instruments
List of folk music traditions
List of musical instruments by Hornbostel–Sachs number

References

External links